The Troy Slapshots were a professional ice hockey team based in Troy, New York. They were a member of the Atlantic Coast Hockey League in the 1985–86 season.

History
The Slapshots were based out of Staten Island during their inaugural season. By the time the 1985–86 ACHL season started, an arena had not been built so the Slapshots played all of their games on the road. The Phil Esposito Sports & Entertainment Center, located in Staten Island's Travis section, was scheduled to be the home of the Slapshots and was supposed to be operational by their December 7 home opener, but the start of construction was delayed until early November. The arena ended up never being built. Instead, they opened their season in New Jersey and finished their season playing their "home" games primarily in Virginia, competing as a traveling team.

The New York Slapshots were coached by Dave Schultz, a former NHL veteran who spent the majority of his career with the Philadelphia Flyers during their Broad Street Bullies days. Schultz would lead the Slapshots to a 21–38–0 record in his lone season with the Slapshots.

1986–87 season
The following year, owner Rudy Slucker announced that the Slapshots would be playing their games at the Houston Field House, a 5,367-seat arena located on the campus of Rensselaer Polytechnic Institute. The Houston Field House was a familiar site to some, as it was the site of the leaguewide rookie camp and at the time was the largest arena being used in the league

The Slapshots opened their season on October 25, 1986, in front of a crowd of 1312 fans. The Slapshots would beat the Mohawk Valley Comets 8–5. On hand for opening night pregame ceremonies were: Slucker (who dropped the ceremonial puck); Troy mayor Robert Conway; Chamber Of Commerce President John O'Connor; RPI coach Mike Addesa.

The Slapshots would only end up playing four home games before folding. At one point in the Slapshots' brief season, they played "in front of an estimated 120 people" and with the exception of opening night, never played in front of more than 300 people. They would play their last game on November 15, 1986, where they scored a 3–2 shootout victory over the Erie Golden Blades
.

Lack of funding and an inexperienced staff ultimately sealed the Slapshots' fate. An initial report to ACHL Commissioner Ray Miron said that the Slapshots had sold anywhere from 750 to 1000 season tickets prior to the start of the season, when in fact the organization had sold less than 10% of that. A final report showed that the Slapshots had only sold 66 season tickets.

Slucker's lack of funding for the team also hurt the team. Considered to be an "absentee owner" by Commissioner Miron, Slucker told league president Bill Coffey that he needed corporate sponsorship to continue to run the franchise. The average operating fees being $365,000 for a franchise and possibly more as a startup team, Coffey was only able to come up $25,000 to help keep the team operating. Miron said that the $25,000 would not keep the team operational for more than two weeks.

Removal from league
With the nearby Mohawk Valley Comets also struggling, the ACHL Board Of Governors held an emergency meeting in Utica, New York, NY on November 17, 1986. The following decisions resulted from the nine-hour meeting:
 Troy Slapshots would be dropped from the league, effective immediately.
 There would not be a dispersal draft for all players on the Slapshots roster.
 The Mohawk Valley Comets would hold the rights to all the players on the Slapshots roster until November 27, 1986.

The Comets would announce shortly after the meeting that they fired their coach Bill Horton, and replaced him with former Slapshots' coach and general manager Joe Selenski. The ACHL would finish the season with four teams: Mohawk Valley, Erie Golden Blades, Virginia Lancers, and Carolina Thunderbirds. The following season, Mohawk Valley would be replaced by the Utica Devils in the American Hockey League, while the Virginia and Carolina teams would join the All-American Hockey League.

Season-by-season results

New York Slapshots

Troy Slapshots

Playoffs
None

Notable Personnel
 Dave Schultz, former coach, 1985–86 season
 Mike Vasilevich, Centre, 1985–86 season

References 

Atlantic Coast Hockey League teams
Ice hockey clubs established in 1985
Sports clubs disestablished in 1986
Defunct sports teams in New York (state)
1985 establishments in New York (state)
Ice hockey teams in New York (state)
1986 disestablishments in New York (state)